"How to Dance" is a song by Austrian house music trio Bingoboys from their debut studio album, The Best of Bingoboys. The song features American female rapper Princessa. The song was first released in the United States in 1990 and was given a European release in March 1991. "How to Dance" peaked at number two in Austria and reached the top 10 in Australia, Denmark, Finland, and the Netherlands. In the US, it climbed to number 25 on the Billboard Hot 100 and topped the Billboard Hot Dance Club Play chart for one week in March 1991.

The music video for the song was nominated for an MTV Video Music Award in the category of "Best Dance Video", but it lost out to "Gonna Make You Sweat (Everybody Dance Now)" by the C+C Music Factory.

Composition

The song borrows heavily from a number of earlier recordings, including "Dance, Dance, Dance (Yowsah, Yowsah, Yowsah)" by the band Chic, "Dance (Disco Heat)" by the disco singer Sylvester, "Kiss" by Art of Noise feat. Tom Jones, the popular James Brown "Yeah! Woo!" sample loop, the bassline motif from Mantronix's single "Got to Have Your Love", and a synth motif from The Whispers' "And the Beat Goes On". In addition, the song contains audio samples from an instructional recording from the 1970s that attempted to teach people "how to dance" (for example, Step left, around, and together with the right).

Charts

Weekly charts

Year-end charts

Release history

See also
 List of number-one dance singles of 1991 (U.S.)

References

1990 debut singles
Atlantic Records singles
Dance music songs
1990 songs